Memecylon capitellatum is a species of plant in the family Melastomataceae. It is endemic to Sri Lanka. It is known as "weli kaha - වැලි කහ" by local Sinhalese people.

Uses
leaves, stem- medicinal; Wood - tool handles.

References

Sources
 http://www.theplantlist.org/tpl1.1/record/tro-20305366
 http://linnean-online.org/41196/
 http://www.mpnet.iora-rcstt.org/node/3195

capitellatum
Endemic flora of Sri Lanka